"Me Muero" (Spanish for "I Die" or "I Am Dying") is La 5ª Estación's second single release from their third studio album, El mundo se equivoca.

Song information
"Me Muero" was officially released to American and Latin American radio towards the end of 2006. In Mexico, the song topped the official singles chart for eleven weeks in a row, eventually being succeeded by Julieta Venegas' "Eres para mí". In the United States, the song peaked at number two on the Latin Pop Airplay chart and number ten on the Hot Latin Tracks chart. In Spain, the song peaked at number two. According to Promusicae, "Me Muero" has been certified 6× Platinum in Spain for sales of over 120,000 units, being one of the big hits from 2007 in that country.

The song was recently re-done in a "Banda" style by Objetivo Fama finalist and Mexican singer "Azucena del Campo", and has been released to much acclaim.

Music video
The music video for "Me Muero" begins with what appears as a fan cutting and pasting pictures of a wrestling star. The collage album is then given to the wrestler and he reflects on it while he faces a match. La 5ª Estación is shown singing from the ring in the arena. The supposed fan then shows up to the match as sign of support. Finally a scene is shown where the two kiss and it is revealed that the fan was actually the wrestler's wife. The main wrestler in the video is professional Mexican wrestler, Místico.

Charts

Certifications

References

La 5ª Estación songs
2006 singles
2006 songs
Songs written by Armando Ávila
Songs written by Natalia Jiménez
Song recordings produced by Armando Ávila